The Focus Group was founded in 1976 and has become one of the leading companies in the UK for the design, sourcing and distribution of branded and own brand footwear, apparel and accessories.

It holds a number of third party licences and also designs and sources product from a number of sports and fashion retailers.

The company is 49% owned by JD Sports parent company.

In May 2007, Manchester City Football Club agreed a deal with the group that saw the club kitted out by French manufacturers Le Coq Sportif. In May 2009, Everton Football Club followed suit.

Third Party Licenses

 Eckō Unltd.
 Le Coq Sportif
 Sergio Tacchini

References

Clothing companies of the United Kingdom